The College of Nursing is a college within the University of Wisconsin–Milwaukee. It is the largest nursing school in Wisconsin, offering bachelor's, master's, and doctoral degrees. In addition to the main campus at UW-Milwaukee, the College of Nursing also has a Bachelor of Science in Nursing Program at UW-Parkside and UW-Washington County.

The College of Nursing was ranked 32nd nationally by U.S. News & World Report in 2010. It ranked 36th among Schools of Nursing in the US for National Institutes of Health (NIH) funding.

Research centers

Center for Cultural Diversity and Global Health
Center for Nursing History
Harriet H. Werley Center for Nursing Research and Evaluation

Institute for Urban Health Partnerships
Nursing Learning Resource Center
Self Management Science Center

See also
University of Wisconsin–Milwaukee College of Health Sciences
University of Wisconsin–Milwaukee School of Public Health

References

External links
University of Wisconsin–Milwaukee College of Nursing
University of Wisconsin–Milwaukee

University of Wisconsin–Milwaukee
Nursing schools in Wisconsin